is an Italian-Japanese comedy adventure anime television series produced by Studio Junio and River Cinematografica and which was broadcast in Japan on NHK from April 2, 1994 through April 8, 1995 and in Italy on Italia 1 from June 1997. Montana Jones has a similar atmosphere to Sherlock Hound, a joint production of RAI and TMS Entertainment ten years earlier. The anthropomorphic characters in Montana Jones were big cats instead of the dogs used in Sherlock Hound. It was subsequently broadcast in over 30 other countries.

The series takes place in the 1930s and is about the adventures of Montana Jones, who goes treasure hunting with his cousin Alfred Jones and the beautiful reporter Melissa Thorn. They visit real locations and cities like the Pyramids of Giza, the Taj Mahal, Istanbul or Easter Island. Frequently they cross paths with Lord Zero - a rich, eccentric art lover and master thief. All characters in the series are anthropomorphized big cats. The anime was inspired by the Indiana Jones movies.

Synopsis 
Boston, 1930:
Montana Jones and his cousin professor Alfred Jones travel around the world to search lost treasures in order to bring them  to museums. Alfred's mentor Professor Gerrit helps them by sending gramophone records with information. On one trip they meet Melissa, a wealthy reporter, who speaks nearly all languages. She accompanies the two on their trips. Their opponent is Lord Zero, a rich, bizarre art lover and master thief. Lord Zero has two henchmen: Slim and Slam. There is also the inventor Dr. Nitro, who also works for Lord Zero and invents strange engines, which to help finding treasures.

Main characters

Montana Jones
 is always seeking the unknown and isn't afraid to do dangerous things. Together with his cousin Alfred he travels around the world finding treasures for Gerrit, Alfred's professor. The group's plans are often foiled by Lord Zero.  Montana works in his aunt's restaurant to finance his airplane Ketty, a Supermarine GS waterplane constantly in need of repair. He lives somewhere on the coast in Boston. It is believed that Montana is infatuated with Melissa Thorn.

He was voiced by Akio Ohtsuka.

Alfred Jones
 likes to study old cultures, strange languages, and treasures.  On the other hand, he hates danger, travelling, and can't swim, making him an opposite of his cousin Montana.  Together, the two make a good team. Alfred loves his mother and eating spaghetti bolognese, which he often prepares for Melissa and Montana.

He was voiced by Ryusei Nakao.

Melissa Thorn
 often helps Montana and Alfred and is the daughter of a diplomat. Melissa is a journalist and enjoys shopping and adventures with the two.
In the last episode her father is revealed to be Professor Gerrit, explaining why Melissa was always at the right time and place to help Montana and Alfred.

She was voiced by Junko Iwao.

Agatha Jones
（episodes 1-8, 10, 12-13, 15-18, 23, 24-28, 33-34, 38-39, 45, 51-52) is Alfred's mother, and Montana's aunt.

She was voiced by Rihoko Yoshida.

Lord Zero
 is the main antagonist of the story, constantly trying to get all the treasure for himself only to be thwarted by Montana and Alfred. Usually his plans are foiled because of a mistake from his minions Slim, Slam or Dr. Nitro. Lord Zero is notable for his walking staffs, which all have strange and diverse functionalities. Zero is constantly in a bad mood, and personally hates the excuse "I'm sorry, it wouldn't have happened if you gave me more time and money."

He was voiced by Ryuzaburo Otomo.

Slim and Slam
 are the bumbling minions of Lord Zero. The two know searching for the treasures themselves would be more successful but their loyalty is greater than their daring. They often do the difficult work for Lord Zero, and when things go wrong they usually take the blame. Ironically, Slim is the larger of the two. Slam is the shorter and larger of the two.

Slim was voiced by Toshiharu Sakurai and Slam was voiced by Chō.

Dr. Nitro
 is a minion of Lord Zero and a genius. He is a creator of machines for Lord Zero that never seem to work the right way, and often gives the excuse "it wouldn't have happened if you gave me more time and money" to defend them.  Unfortunately, Lord Zero hates that excuse.

He was voiced by Junpei Takiguchi.

Episodes and locations 

There are 52 episodes.

Video game
A eponymously titled video game developed by Future Pirates based on the anime was released in 1995 for the 3DO.

References

External links 
 
 Official Homepage from NHK via the Wayback Machine (Japanese)

1994 anime television series debuts
Television series set in the 1930s
Italian children's animated adventure television series
Italian children's animated comedy television series
Japanese children's animated adventure television series
Japanese children's animated comedy television series
Fiction about Earth
Television series about tigers
Fictional tigers
NHK original programming
Indiana Jones